Louise Shaffer (born July 5, 1942) is an American actress, script writer, and author.

Biography

Shaffer was born in Woodbridge, Connecticut, where she showed an interest in acting early on in her life. After finishing high school, she attended Connecticut College for Women, then Yale Drama School.  Shaffer is a coloratura soprano, and was trained at Juilliard.

Career

Actress
Throughout her life, Shaffer has appeared in numerous soap operas, including Search for Tomorrow, Hidden Faces (1968–1969), and Where the Heart Is. From 1975 to 1976, she he played split personality Serena Faraday/Josie on The Edge of Night.

From 1977 to 1984, Shaffer played journalism magnate Rae Woodard on Ryan's Hope and then reprised the role for the show's finale in 1989. In the summer of 1987, she was brought onto All My Children, playing Erica's evil stepmother, Goldie Kane. After several years as a script writer on various soaps, she had brief roles on Guiding Light as Lewis oil client Mrs. Humphreys (1993), and a stint as the judge in the Peter Lewis custody battle (1994).

She was nominated for two Daytime Emmy Awards for her portrayal of Rae Woodard on Ryan's Hope; she won the award in 1983. In addition to her daytime roles, Shaffer also had a role on the short-lived Norman Lear serialized sitcom All That Glitters.

Author
Shaffer began writing for soap operas instead of acting on them. Since the late 1980s, she has written for Ryan's Hope, Loving, General Hospital, and As the World Turns.

In addition to scriptwriting, Shaffer has written numerous books.

Personal life
Shaffer was formerly married to actor Toby Tompkins. She is currently married to Roger Crews, who also wrote for Ryan's Hope and Search for Tomorrow.

Acting credits

Writing credits

 All My Children (2000–2002)
 As the World Turns (1994–2000)
 General Hospital (1992–1993)
 Loving (1990–1991)
 Another World (1989)
 Ryan's Hope (1987–1989)

References

Bibliography

External links
 Interview on Show #9 with Robert Reid, on Robert Reid Live
 Louise Shaffer - IMDB

American soap opera actresses
American soap opera writers
Yale School of Drama alumni
1942 births
Living people
People from Woodbridge, Connecticut
Daytime Emmy Award winners
Daytime Emmy Award for Outstanding Supporting Actress in a Drama Series winners
American stage actresses
20th-century American actresses
American women screenwriters
Women soap opera writers
Actresses from Connecticut
Connecticut College alumni
Juilliard School alumni
Screenwriters from Connecticut
21st-century American women